The Investment Fund for Economic and Social Development (or FIDES) was a development finance institution active in the French colonial empire, notably in Africa. It was established in 1946.

It was widely criticized for having failed in many development programs. René Dumont (1962) writes of FIDES:"within the framework of FIDES very large sums were granted to French-speaking Africa. In face of the immense needs, however, they seemed quite modest. The aid could in fact have been increased many times without a corresponding tax pressure, had France had the courage politically to decolonize more rapidly. Forty-six percent of the FIDES grants, particularly in the first four-year plan, were used to build roads, ports and airports. These were indispensable to open up the countries, but could have been achieved at less cost."

Paul Nugent states that "the consensus among historians is that FIDES amounted to much more than an ideological figleaf. It did channel substantial resources into the African colonies - initially (as in the British case) into infrastructural development, but later also into industrial enterprises and agricultural projects."

References

Further reading

Paul Nugent (2004) Africa since independence, Palgrave Macmillan, Basikngstoke

Defunct organizations based in France
1946 establishments in France
French colonial empire